is a town located in Sōya Subprefecture, Hokkaido, Japan. The town is in a long period of sustained population loss. It is the location of Lake Kutcharo, a freshwater wetlands area used by thousands of swans making their winter migration from northern Siberia to Japan.

Geography

Climate

Education

Hamatonbetsu has one local high school and a junior high school, as well as a kindergarten and nursery school within the town limits. The Hamatonbetsu Board of Education also oversees four additional elementary schools and another junior high school. Shanai Elementary School, Toyokanbetsu Elementary School, Usotan Elementary School, Shimotombetsu Elementary School, and Shimotombetsu Junior High School are all included.

The town of Hamatonbetsu participates in the JET Programme.

Economy
Hamatonbetsu's local economy depends mainly on dairy farming and harvesting salmon, scallops, and crabs.

Within the town there is a park golf course and an onsen on the edge of Lake Kutcharo.

Transportation
Hamatonbetsu has a bus terminal.  It was previously serviced by Hama-Tombetsu railway station on the Tempoku Line until the line and station were abandoned on 1 May 1989. The nearest railway station is now Otoineppu Station to the south, a 1.5 hour bus ride away.

Mascot

Hamatonbetsu's mascot is  who is a gentle yet clumsy pig dressed as a tundra swan. He lives in areas surrounding Lake Kutcharo. His birthday is August 21. According to Ainu legend, he first appeared during the Jomon period to bring food and medical needs for good health and protection from crimes and natural disasters. Nowadays, he is no longer a god anymore. Instead, he is now a ballet dancer (who is auditioning for Swan Lake) and the assistant to the mayor. He still helps the town to children and adults around the world and brings happiness during difficult times by his dance moves while promoting the town. He knows laughter is the best medicine.

References

External links

Official Website 

Towns in Hokkaido